Domenico Moschella, also known as Dominic Moschella, was a politician in Montreal, Quebec, Canada. He served on the Montreal City Council from 2013 to 2015, representing Saint-Léonard-Est as a member of Coalition Montréal.

Moschella was previously a city councillor in Saint-Leonard from 1982 to 1986 and again from 1990 to 2001, prior to the suburban community's amalgamation into the city of Montreal. He also served as a commissioner on the Commission scolaire de la Pointe-de-l'Île.

Moschella died in office on June 23, 2015.

Private career
Moschella was vice-president of an investment counselling firm in 1986. He later worked as a restaurateur.

Municipal councillor
1982–86
Moschella was first elected to the Saint-Leonard council for the city's third district in the 1982 municipal election as a member of mayor Antonio di Ciocco's Équipe du renouveau de la cité de Saint-Léonard. Di Ciocco died in 1984, and his party subsequently split into two groups: Moschella led a new party called Action civique de Saint-Léonard while Raymond Renaud led the rival Ralliement de Saint-Léonard. A mayoral by-election was held in September 1984, and Renaud defeated Moschella in what proved to be an extremely divisive contest.

Renaud later stated that Moschella had run a "malicious" campaign against him; in December 1984, he launched a $41,000 suit for alleged defamatory remarks. Moschella threatened to counter-sue, saying that the new mayor would "wind up paying [his] legal fees and then some" if the matter came to court. He also said that Renaud's lawsuit would be harmful to the democratic process, as politicians might become reluctant to speak openly if they were concerned about provoking legal action. Newspaper accounts do not indicate how the matter was resolved.

Moschella was the only Saint-Leonard city councillor to serve with the Action civique party following the 1984 by-election. He later called for a merger of the city's three opposition parties, and in late 1986 he dissolved Action civique to become a founding member of a new group called Unité de Saint-Léonard. He ran for re-election under this party's banner for the city's twelfth ward in the 1986 municipal election and narrowly lost to Robert Zambito, a candidate of Renaud's slate.

In early 1986, Moschella argued that Saint-Leonard should reduce its business tax rate so as to benefit shopkeepers. The following year, he took part in a local protest against property tax increases.
1990–2001
Renaud's political party lost much of its governing authority in 1988, when councillor Frank Zampino launched a breakaway group (later consolidated as the Parti municipal) with support from a majority of councillors. Moschella appears to have effected a political reconciliation with Renaud after this time, as he was elected as a Ralliement de Saint-Léonard candidate in the 1990 municipal election. Zampino defeated Renaud for the mayoralty and the Parti municipal won a majority on council; Moschella was one of only two opposition councillors to be elected.

In March 1994, Moschella joined with the only other remaining opposition councillor and crossed the floor to join Zampino party's. According to Moschella, city council had already become a collegial, non-partisan environment prior to this time; when he joined Zampino's party, he was quoted as saying, "They [Parti municipal members] treated us as part of the team. We were always aware of everything that was going on." This decision effectively ended partisan politics on Saint-Leonard council for the next seven years, until the city's merger into the new city of Montreal. Moschella was re-elected without opposition in 1994 and again in 1998.

Montreal city politics
Moschella intended to run for a seat on the Montreal City Council in the 2001 municipal election as a member of mayor Pierre Bourque's Vision Montreal party, but he withdrew before election day. He ran for a seat on the Saint-Leonard borough council in 2005 and 2009 and was defeated both times. On the latter occasion, he was a candidate of the newly formed Action civique Montréal.

In the 2013 election, Moschella was elected to Montreal City Council as a Coalition Montréal candidate in the district of Saint-Léonard-Est, winning by just eighty votes over Projet Montréal's Roberta Peressini. The result was heavily impacted by incumbent candidate Robert Zambito's late withdrawal from the race on corruption allegations. The number of rejected ballots exceeded the number of votes for Moschella.

School commissioner
Moschella was elected to the Commission scolaire Jérôme-Le Royer in 1987 and was re-elected in 1990 and 1994. In 1988, he promoted a plan to increase French and English immersion courses for the younger grades. He did not seek re-election in 1998 when the confessional Commission scolaire Jérôme-Le Royer was replaced by the language-based Commission scolaire de la Pointe-de-l'Île, but he was returned to the new board without opposition in 2002, 2003 and 2007.

Electoral record

Council and mayoral elections

School commission elections

References

External links
Commissaire/Vice-président de la Commission administrative: Domenico Moschella 

2015 deaths
Canadian people of Italian descent
Montreal city councillors
People from Saint-Leonard, Quebec
Quebec school board members